Samułki Duże  (Samulky Velyki) is a village in the administrative district of Gmina Wyszki, within Bielsk County, Podlaskie Voivodeship, in north-eastern Poland.

According to the 1921 census, the village was inhabited by 175 people, among whom 168 were Roman Catholic, 1 Orthodox, and 6 Mosaic. At the same time, 168 inhabitants declared Polish nationality, 1 Belarusian and 6 Jewish. There were 31 residential buildings in the village.

The village has a population of 200.

References

Villages in Bielsk County